Heda Armour (1914–1996), later Heda Munro and Heda Napper, was a British painter and etcher.

Biography
Hedvig (Heda) Sophie Armour was born on 23 May 1914 in Recife, Brazil to Stewart and Gabrielle Matilda (née Crosse) Armour. After a private education Armour trained at the Guildford School of Art from 1930 to 1933 before spending six years studying at the Royal Academy Schools where her teachers included Walter Thomas Monnington and Sir Walter Westley Russell.
 Armour went on to become a regular exhibitor at the Royal Academy in London and elsewhere in Britain. She lived at Cranleigh in Surrey and the British Museum holds an example of her work.

References

1914 births
20th-century British painters
20th-century British women artists
Alumni of the University for the Creative Arts
Alumni of the Royal Academy Schools
Year of death missing
British expatriates in Brazil